Patrick Stirling may refer to:
 Patrick Stirling (railway engineer), Scottish railway engineer
 Patrick Stirling (footballer),Scottish footballer
 Patrick James Stirling, Scottish lawyer and author